The 1968 United States presidential election in Massachusetts took place on November 5, 1968, as part of the 1968 United States presidential election, which was held throughout all 50 states and D.C. Voters chose 14 representatives, or electors to the Electoral College, who voted for president and vice president.

Massachusetts voted overwhelmingly for the Democratic nominee, incumbent Vice President Hubert H. Humphrey of Minnesota, over the Republican nominee, former Vice President Richard Nixon of California. Humphrey's running mate was Senator Edmund Muskie of Maine, while Nixon ran with Governor Spiro Agnew of Maryland.

Humphrey carried Massachusetts in a landslide, taking 63.01% of the vote to Nixon’s 32.89%, a Democratic victory margin of 30.12%. This made it the second most Democratic state in the nation, after Rhode Island.

The American Independent candidate, Southern populist Governor George Wallace of Alabama, did not have a serious impact on the race. While taking 13.53% nationally and winning electoral votes from five Deep South states,  A Boston Globe poll in October had Wallace with 8% support but had collapsed to take only 3.73% of the vote in Massachusetts. Wallace’s base of support was in the South, and he had little appeal in New England states. Massachusetts would be Wallace’s fourth weakest state in the nation.

As Nixon eked out a narrow win of the White House nationally in the Electoral College, Humphrey’s landslide win in Massachusetts made the state a whopping 31% more Democratic than the national average.

Massachusetts had been a Democratic-leaning state since 1928, and a Democratic stronghold since 1960 — and the 1960s would prove to be a decade of Democratic dominance in Massachusetts. Prior to 1960, Massachusetts had usually been a swing state, and Republican Dwight D. Eisenhower had carried it by 19 points in 1956. However, in 1960 Massachusetts native John F. Kennedy would become the first Democrat ever to win Massachusetts with over 60% of the vote, taking 60.22%. In the midst of the 1964 nationwide Democratic landslide, President Lyndon B. Johnson had carried the state in a historically massive landslide, taking over 76% of the vote in Massachusetts to Republican Barry Goldwater’s 23%. While Humphrey did not reach Johnson’s level of support, his 63.01% outperformed JFK and remains the third highest vote share any Democratic presidential candidate has ever received in the state — even though Humphrey was losing the election nationally, thus establishing the state’s reputation as a Democratic stronghold in the modern era.

Despite the scale of Humphrey’s statewide landslide, he did not sweep every county in Massachusetts. Humphrey won 10 of the state’s 14 counties, while Nixon won 4. However Humphrey performed especially well in the most heavily populated parts of the state surrounding the large cities of Boston, Worcester, and Springfield, while Nixon won only the smallest peninsula and island counties.

Nevertheless, Nixon became the first Republican ever to win the White House without carrying Norfolk County.

Four years later, Massachusetts would be the only state in the nation to remain Democratic and vote for George McGovern over Nixon in 1972. Having also voted for John F. Kennedy over Nixon in 1960, Massachusetts would ultimately be the only state in the nation to never vote for Richard Nixon in any of his three presidential campaigns.

As of 2021, this is the last time that the towns of Leverett, Shutesbury, and West Tisbury voted Republican.

Results

Results by county

See also
 United States presidential elections in Massachusetts

Notes

References

Massachusetts
1968
1968 Massachusetts elections